The Est 0.250 to 0.500 and 0.701 to 0.766 were 0-6-0 locomotives for freight traffic of the Chemins de fer de l'Est.
They were first put in service in 1859 and retired from service from 1892 until 1937.

Construction history
The series then received the numbers Est 0.300-0.350.

Already in 1859 the design had been adopted by the Chemins de fer de l'Est, which had the type built from 1859 to 1884 without significant changes by their own workshops as well as various other manufacturers as series Est 0.250-0299 and 0.350-0.478.

In 1881-1882 the locomotives Est 0.479-0.500 as well as 0.701-0.708, and in 1883-1884 the 0.709-0.766 were put into service.
Due to their longer fireboxes these later machines had an increased power output.

From 1904 to 1909 forty-eight of the machines from series 0.252-0.428 were rebuilt as 2-6-0 two-cylinder compound locomotives.

From 1906 to 1926 ninety-two of the machines from series 0.254-0.489 and 0.701-0.766 were rebuilt as 2-6-0 locomotives with simple expansion.

Locomotive names
The locomotives of the earlier series received names. They were named as follows:

Series 0.250 – 0.299:

Series 0.300 – 0.349:

Series 0.350 – 0.387:

Series 0.401 – 0.420 (named after Merovingians):

References

Bibliography

 

Steam locomotives of France
0.250
Railway locomotives introduced in 1859
0-6-0 locomotives
C n2 locomotives

Freight locomotives